Joseph Shabbethai Farhi (1802–1882) was a Talmudic scholar and kabbalist of the 19th century. His most famous work was Oseh Fele, published in 1845.

References

 

1802 births
1882 deaths